Skyler White (née Lambert) is a fictional character in Breaking Bad, portrayed by Anna Gunn. For her performance, Gunn received critical acclaim, with some critics even lauding her character as the template for television anti-heroines.

Character biography 
Over the years, Skyler has had several meager sources of income: working as a bookkeeper for the Albuquerque firm Beneke Fabricators, writing short stories, and selling items on eBay. She and her husband, Walter White (Bryan Cranston), have a son, Walt Jr. (RJ Mitte), who has cerebral palsy, and an infant daughter, Holly (Elanor Anne Wenrich). Her sister, Marie (Betsy Brandt), is married to a DEA agent, Hank Schrader (Dean Norris). Skyler is 12 years younger than Walt, whom she met when she was a hostess at a diner near Walt's former place of work, near the Los Alamos National Laboratory.

Season 1 

Skyler is in the middle stages of pregnancy with Holly at the beginning of the show. When Walt is diagnosed with terminal lung cancer, he initially does not tell his family. When Skyler learns about the diagnosis, she is both devastated by the news and outraged that Walt withheld the information. Their relationship becomes strained, both from Walt's reluctance to seek treatment and from his unexplained absences following his diagnosis. Skyler figures out Walt's connection to his former student, Jesse Pinkman (Aaron Paul), and confronts Jesse at his house. When she confronts Walt, he claims that Jesse is his marijuana dealer. Unbeknownst to Skyler, Walt has taken up cooking methamphetamine with Jesse in order to ensure his family's financial security after he dies.

Skyler faces other problems as well. When Marie offers an expensive white gold tiara as a gift for Holly's baby shower, Skyler attempts to return it to the jewelry store, only to learn that her sister, a kleptomaniac, had stolen the item. Skyler is detained by the store's owner and escapes arrest only after faking labor pains. The incident causes serious problems in Skyler's relationship with Marie, who emphatically denies that she has done anything wrong.

Season 2 

When Walt is kidnapped by Mexican drug kingpin Tuco Salamanca (Raymond Cruz), his family, unaware of the connection to Walt's criminal activities, organizes a search for him as a missing person. When Walt escapes, he fakes a "fugue state", claiming to have no memory of the last few days. The marriage continues going downhill because of Walt's continued absences, devolving to the point where Skyler refuses to speak to him. Skyler is also perturbed by Walt's resistance to his son's efforts to raise money for Walt's cancer treatments, unaware that most of the donations actually constitute drug money laundered by Walt's corrupt lawyer, Saul Goodman (Bob Odenkirk).

Still unaware of Walt's meth business, Skyler believes his illness has strained the family's finances and returns to her old job working as an accountant for Ted Beneke (Christopher Cousins), whose sexual advances had earlier caused her to quit. She increasingly relies on Ted for emotional support as her husband grows distant; she also reluctantly covers up Ted's tax fraud. Shortly afterward, Skyler gives birth to a daughter, Holly; Walt is absent for the occasion, having been forced to appear for a meth transaction with drug kingpin Gus Fring (Giancarlo Esposito).

When Skyler becomes suspicious that Walt owns a second cell phone, Walt emphatically denies it. However, while Walt is medicated prior to cancer surgery, he indicates the opposite by replying, "Which one?", when Skyler asks if he has packed his cell phone. After Walt recovers, Skyler confronts him about that and leaves him when he lies about it.

Season 3 

In the third season, Walt has moved out of the house. Skyler appears at his apartment, having deduced that he is in the drug trade. When she confronts Walt with her idea that he is selling cocaine, he admits instead that he is a meth cook. Skyler demands a divorce in exchange for her silence about Walt's criminal activities. Skyler's rationale for remaining silent is two-fold: She does not want her children to find out about their father's double life, and she fears that Walt's arrest could ruin Hank's career as a DEA agent.  She also demands that Walt move out of the family's home. When Walt defiantly moves back in, Skyler retaliates by initiating an affair with Ted and coldly informing her husband that she cheated on him.

Even as her marriage crumbles, Skyler permits Walt to take care of Holly and defends some of his actions to her lawyer, who advises that she leave Walt immediately. She later finds that Walt has signed off on their divorce and left the house for good. When Ted arrives at her home and tries to clarify the nature of Skyler's feelings, she refuses to answer and asks him to leave.

After Hank is shot during a failed hit by the Mexican cartel, Skyler tells Marie that Walt earned millions through card counting at underground blackjack games and offers to pay for Hank's physical therapy. She later admits to Walt that she never filed the divorce papers, slowly beginning to work her way into his criminal activities by reminding him that spouses cannot be forced to testify against each other. Skyler suggests Walt should launder his drug money by purchasing the car wash facility where he used to work, and offers to handle the books.

Season 4 

Skyler buys the car wash and begins laundering Walt's drug money. She and Walt eventually have sex for the first time in months, and slowly begin to rebuild their relationship. At the same time, however, she begins to fear him and worries that her children are in danger. At one point, she is so consumed with panic that she considers fleeing with Holly. When Ted is gravely injured during an encounter with Walt's associates, she feels responsible, having used Walt's drug money to pay off Ted's back taxes and then sent two of Saul's enforcers to ensure he did not use it for anything else, leading to the injury. However, as a side-effect of Skyler's actions with Ted, Walt is left without the money to pay Saul's "disappearer" to take the family to a new life. Later, when Hank and Marie are under protective custody at their house, Skyler, Holly, and Walter Jr. join them. When she sees on the news that Gus Fring has been killed, she makes a panicked phone call to Walt, who calmly informs her that he has "won"; she then realizes that Walt killed him.

Season 5

Part 1 
Following Fring's death, Skyler becomes terrified of Walt, as well as the prospect of going to prison as his accomplice. She breaks down in front of Marie at the car wash and falls into a deep state of depression. During a tense dinner with Hank and Marie, she stages a suicide attempt in an effort to convince the Schraders to temporarily take custody of the children. With them gone, Skyler makes it plain to Walt that she will do anything she can to keep them out of the house until his lung cancer kills him. Walt explains her emotional distress to the Schraders as the effect of serious marital discord, and he exposes Skyler's affair with Ted in the process. This taints Skyler's relationship with Marie, closing off a potential path of escape; Skyler is now effectively a prisoner in her own home. While she continues to launder money through the car wash, her attitude towards Walt devolves into a barely concealed hatred. Skyler eventually brings Walt to a storage locker packed with millions of dollars in cash, convincing him to get out of the drug business, as they now have more money than they will ever need.

Part 2 
When Hank deduces that Walt is a drug kingpin, he goes to Skyler under the assumption she was forced to keep quiet, but she refuses to give evidence. When Hank tells Marie, she meets with Skyler and is outraged to learn Skyler knew about Walt's activities before Hank was shot. Marie threatens to take Holly with her but leaves the baby behind at Hank's insistence. When Hank is killed after arresting Walt, Skyler, believing Walt to be the killer, demands that he leave their house and threatens him with a knife. A physical altercation ensues which is ended by Walter Jr., who calls 911. Walt responds by taking his daughter Holly, ignoring Skyler's desperate pleas for him to stop. That evening, Walt calls Skyler, as the police monitor the call, and effectively exonerates her of his misdeeds under the guise of an angry tirade. He leaves Holly at a fire station.

As a national manhunt is launched for Walt, Skyler is questioned by federal prosecutors about his whereabouts. One of Walt's associates, Todd Alquist (Jesse Plemons), and his gang break into the White home and threaten to kill Skyler and her children if she talks.

A few months later, Walt learns that Skyler works as a taxi dispatcher and is using her maiden name; no court date has been set. Skyler and her children have moved out of the house, which is now abandoned. After Walt is sighted in Albuquerque, Marie calls her sister to warn her. But Walt is already at the home and has a long talk with Skyler, who is still angry at him but did not disclose he was there to Marie and makes no moves to contact law enforcement. Skyler figures out that Walt plans a suicide mission against the people who killed Hank and lets him imply this without stating it, and when she thinks Walt is going to give her his remaining drug money (which he actually forced the Schwartzes to launder for him) she tells him she and Flynn made it clear they don't want it. When Walt seems like he is going to use her and their kids as an excuse for his actions, Skyler gets angry, but is left stunned and silent when Walt admits that he entered the drug business for himself rather than his family which seems to give Skyler some relief and closure, and then he gives her a lottery ticket with the coordinates of the makeshift grave in which Hank and Steve Gomez are buried to use as leverage for striking a deal with the prosecutors. Skyler then allows Walt to see Holly one last time before he leaves. She smiles slightly while witnessing this.

Post-Breaking Bad

Two months after the events of Breaking Bad, Francesca Liddy (Tina Parker) uses a payphone to receive a call from Saul Goodman, who had been hiding under the name Gene Takavic in Omaha, Nebraska. Francesca tells him that Skyler received a deal from the authorities in exchange for the GPS coordinates of the bodies of Hank and Gomez, as Walt had planned and hoped.

Reception 
For her performance as Skyler, Anna Gunn received critical acclaim, with some critics even lauding her character as the template for television anti-heroines. For her portrayal, Gunn won two consecutive Primetime Emmy Awards for Outstanding Supporting Actress in a Drama Series in 2013 and 2014. In 2014, her performance in the episode "Ozymandias" was named as one of the best performances on television on various critics lists. She also won the Screen Actors Guild Award for Outstanding Performance by an Ensemble in a Drama Series in 2014. 

The character drew an extremely negative reception from some viewers, and Gunn was often subject to social media criticism and bullying. The online harassment and threats became so bad that Gunn became concerned for her own physical safety, prompting her to write an op-ed published in The New York Times describing some of these incidents. 

Matt Zoller Seitz of Vulture considers her to be the Breaking Bad equivalent of Better Call Saul character Chuck McGill, a character that received similar disdain from audiences.

References

External links 
 Skyler White at AMC

American female characters in television
Breaking Bad characters
Female characters in television
Fictional accountants
Fictional attempted suicides
Fictional blackmailers
Fictional businesspeople
Fictional characters from New Mexico
Fictional criminals
Fictional housewives
Fictional money launderers
Fictional waiting staff
Fictional writers
Television characters introduced in 2008